Choi Dae-chul (born Choi Won-chul on October 16, 1978) is a South Korean actor. He has been active in musical theatre since 2002, but has also played supporting roles in television dramas such as Wang's Family (2013), Jang Bo-ri Is Here! (2014), My Daughter, Geum Sa-wol (2015), and Our Gap-soon (2016).

Theater

Filmography

Television series

Web series

Film

Television shows

Awards and nominations

Notes

References

External links
 Choi Dae-chul at GG Entertainment 
 
 
 

1978 births
Living people
South Korean male musical theatre actors
South Korean male stage actors
South Korean male television actors
South Korean male film actors
Hanyang University alumni
Dae-chul